Joseph Earl Lucey [Scootch] (March 27, 1897 – July 30, 1980) was a pitcher / shortstop in Major League Baseball. He was born in Holyoke, Massachusetts.

Lucey entered the majors in 1920 with the New York Yankees, appearing for them in two games at shortstop and second base before joining the Boston Red Sox in 1925. While in Boston, he also pitched in seven games, including two starts. He was a .111 hitter (2-for-18) in 13 games. As a pitcher, he posted a 0–1 record with a 9.00 earned run average in 11.0 innings of work.

Lucey died in his hometown of Holyoke, Massachusetts, at age 83.

External links

Retrosheet

Boston Red Sox players
New York Yankees players
Major League Baseball shortstops
Major League Baseball pitchers
Baseball players from Massachusetts
Fordham Rams baseball players
Catholic University Cardinals baseball players
Sportspeople from Holyoke, Massachusetts
1897 births
1980 deaths